The Orleans Public Defenders (OPD) office provides legal assistance to individuals charged with a crime in New Orleans, Louisiana state courts who are financially unable to retain private counsel. Courts within their jurisdiction include the Louisiana District Courts, Juvenile and Family Courts, Louisiana Circuit Courts of Appeal, and the Louisiana Supreme Court. Orleans Parish District Attorney prosecutes alleged felony and misdemeanor violations of Louisiana state law that occur within the jurisdiction of New Orleans. Alleged federal law violations by indigent defendants are prosecuted and defended in the United States District Court for the Eastern District of Louisiana.

Post-Gideon and pre-OPD
After the 1963 U.S. Supreme Court decision in Gideon v. Wainwright, the city of New Orleans, Louisiana created a network of private attorneys to represent poor defendants part-time, for $29,000 a year. It was called the Orleans Indigent Defender Program. An office of public defenders did not exist at this time. Traffic violations and other court fines and court fees funded more than 75% of the program.

In 1993, Louisiana courts found the program to be unconstitutionally underfunded, but found they could not order the legislature to increase funding. By 2005, the program was underfunded and the office had minimal resources. The Southern Center for Human Rights, in a review, found: public defenders in New Orleans "did not visit crime scenes, interview witnesses, check out alibis, did not procure expert assistance, did not review evidence, did not know the facts of the case even on the eve of trial, did not do any legal research, and did not otherwise prepare for trial."

Hurricane Katrina
After Hurricane Katrina hit in August 2005, there would not be a single criminal trial in New Orleans for nearly ten months. Many public defender clients were lost in the upheaval. With no revenue from traffic citations and court fines, the public defense system collapsed. In the months after the storm, at least 6,000 defendants had no legal representation. Eleven months after the hurricane and into 2006, the public defense system was still in shambles.

The turmoil of the hurricane ultimately led to the reform of the public defense system in New Orleans. Since many of the attorneys on the old public defense panel had left the city, new attorneys had to be recruited. Derwyn Bunton was interested in the rebuilding effort, who later became the head of the office. With millions in funding flowing into the city, new board members established full-time public defenders. They office took the new name: the Orleans Public Defenders Office. The office received many donations to assist the rebuilding effort.

New public defender system
In 2007, the new office, faced with an enormous caseload, refused to represent new clients. Since the reforms radically changed public defense in Orleans, many judges did not like the changes and began holding public defenders in contempt. In January 2007, Loyola Law Professor Steve Singer spent several hours in jail after a judge convicted him of contempt of court because a public defender was absent from a hearing. Singer said the judge was "angry that he doesn't run the public defender's office anymore. The system was operated as a judge-friendly system. It catered to the needs of judges rather than the needs of clients." Many young attorneys from around the country came to the new office, including a woman who left a $170,000 per year salary. She regularly put in 12-hour days, and had 135 clients. She would also uses weekends to catch up on paperwork.

From August 2007 until 2011, the budget for the office increased due to funding from the state and federal government. In 2011, each felony attorney in the office handled around 300 cases that year, double the national standard. Each misdemeanor attorney handled around 2,500 cases, six times the standard and higher than anywhere else in the country.

In 2012, the office's budget was slashed, but then partly restored.

In 2013, the office argued that they were not equipped to deal with gang racketeering indictments. The New York Times Editorial Board applauded the Justice Department's oversight of indigent defense, citing the flaws in the New Orleans system.

In 2014, Chief Defender Derwyn Bunton led the office in a silent protest on the steps of New Orleans' criminal courthouse in memory of Michael Brown, and railed against what he called the "ordinary injustice" pervasive in the building.

In July 2015, it was announced that the office was facing million-dollar budget cuts. The office had a budget of six million dollars. The head of the office said: "You've got a $135 million police force, an $80 million jail, a $6 million court system, and a $15 million DA's office. All those are designed to put people in jail. That is what is designed to catch you and incapacitate you. There is $6 million to make sure your rights aren't violated, justice is done, and you get the right person. That is an incredible disparity."

In September 2015, a public defender in the officer penned an op-ed in the Washington Post criticizing the underfunding of the office. After this op-ed, New Orleans Criminal District Court judge Arthur Hunter summoned Chief Public Defender Derwyn Bunton to his court for a brief hearing to discuss Peng's op-ed. The office also put up a crowdfunding page to help make up its budget shortfall. John Oliver did a segment on the problems in the officer that lamented a "meet 'em and plead 'em system" for indigent defense. Oliver's segment boosted the crowdfunding effort. One author questioned whether crowdfunding was the right response.

Also in 2015, the office with the Department of Justice challenged the transfer of jail inmates to other parishes. Orleans Parish Chief Public Defender Derwyn Bunton criticized the plea deal given to Darren Sharper arguing that his indigent clients would never get such a deal.

References

External links
Official website
Public Defense Matter by Orleans Public Defenders on YouTube

Criminal defense organizations
New Orleans
Government of New Orleans
Organizations based in New Orleans
Effects of Hurricane Katrina
Public defense institutions